The EMD GT26 Locomotive Series made their debut in 1967 after the rise in popularity of the American EMD SD40. Designed to meet most First World, Second World and Third World countries, the GT26 Series were now equipped with a turbocharged high horsepower EMD 645 Series engine as well as six axle HT-C trucks to provide better traction effort at slow speeds. Based on customer input, the GT26 Series would be defined by various designations that suit the customer's railway operations.

The standard suffix after the GT26 designation was the use of six-axle trucks (C); following the C designation, the customer had the option to purchase specific traction motors to fit Narrow Gauge (U) or Broad Gauge (W) rails. It was also around the mid 1970s that customers began to purchase EMD Dash 2 electronics to simplify maintenance.

The GT26 designation can freely apply to the designs of any EMD export model or a licensee of EMD as long as the electrical and mechanical gear were left unaltered.

Overview 
With the introduction of the EMD 645 Series engine now replacing the EMD 567 Series engine in 1967, the locomotive model designation number changed by adding 10 to a similar predecessor model (example: the G12 - 567 engined, now became the G22 - 645 engined). To meet customer demands for a high-horsepower model, EMD created the G16: A longer, six-axle version of the EMD G12 equipped with Flexicoil Type-C trucks and a larger engine with increased horsepower. A turbocharged variation also was available, designating the model as EMD GT16

However, as the EMD 645 Series engine was now in production, the G16 now became the GT26 equipped with a turbocharger. EMD applied the six axle (C) designation to further separate the model from any four-axle models similarly produced.

Several models were introduced:

GT26CW
GT26CWP
GT26CW-2
GT26CW-2A
GT26CW-2B
GT26HCW-2
GT26MC
GT26CU-2
GT26CU-MP
GT36CU-MP
GT36CW
GT36HCW

GT26CW/CWP

The EMD GT26CW first appeared in 1967. Unlike its turbocharged predecessor the GT16, the GT26CW was identified with a W suffix which indicated that this model had traction motors that could fit the locomotive's axles from Indian gauge to Irish Gauge rails; thus Wide would be the understood term for the traction motors.

Production spanned from October 1967 to October 1988.

GT26CW-2/-2A/-2B

Beginning on January 1, 1972, export customers now had the option to purchase EMD Dash 2 electronics on new orders of locomotives. Customers who did purchase EMD Dash 2 electronics had the -2 suffix applied to the end of the locomotive's model designation. The GT26CW-2 made its debut in 1972, but by the mid-1980s, two new designations were added based on mechanical/electrical improvements after the -2 suffix: Type A and Type B.

Production spanned from September 1972 to (Unknown) 2006.

GT26HCW-2
To provide high horsepower in the passenger service, EMD installed Vapor Clarkson boilers for Head End Power on the GT26 series. Customers who purchased locomotives with Head End Power had the H suffix applied after the GT26 designation. Designated GT26HCW-2, this model was only purchased by Algeria's National Railway.

Production spanned from December 1989 to October 1994.

GT26MC

The locomotives received the M suffix which identifies the lightweight frame as well as Universal type traction motors for  rail operation; thus Metric would be the understood term.

Production spanned from August 1971 to August 1982.

GT26CU-2

The EMD GT26CU-2 first appeared in 1976. Unlike its turbocharged predecessor the GT16, the GT26CU-2 was identified with a U suffix which indicated that this model had traction motors that could fit the locomotive's axles from Metre gauge to Irish gauge rails; thus Universal would be the understood term for the traction motors.

Production spanned from May 1976 to August 1992.

GT26CU-MP
In 1990, the GT26 Series made an unusual departure with the use of microprocessor equipped technology. Customers who purchased locomotives equipped with microprocessors were identified by a -MP suffix added after the model designation. Only the Estrada de Ferro Vitória a Minas was the sole purchaser of the GT26CU-MP locomotive model for use on its Narrow Gauge (U) rail lines.  These locomotives are easily identified due to their full-length fuel tank, disappearance of the battery box cabinet, and a rectangular windshield on the engineer's side of the cab. Internally, the locomotive's standard control stand was now replaced with a short desktop control stand.

Production spanned from August 1990 to September 1991.

GT36CU-MP
With the introduction of the 16-645F3B engine for export use, the 26 Series was now identified as the 36 Series, by adding a Further 10 to the predecessor model. Only Zambia Railways purchased the GT36 series with six axle (C) universal traction motors (U) and microprocessor (-MP) controlled computer electronics – designating the model as GT36CU-MP.

Production spanned from October to November 1992.

GT36CW/HCW
Made for Algeria's Standard Gauge Network in 2007, CW is for Freight and HCW for is Passenger duties, painted in Orange and Sky-Blue Livery Respectively. The locomotives are classed as 060-DR in the Freight series and 060-DS in the Passenger series. Their design is made very much similar to India's Broad Gauge GT46MAC(WDG-4) and GT46PAC(WDP-4) locomotives, except the Gauge Difference and that they have a 16-645F3B, with  DC Traction, rather than the 16-710G3B/C (EMD 710) with  AC Traction used in the WDP4/WDG4, being the very next models in the GT36 series, after the GT36CU-MP

See also 
 Iranian locomotives

References 

EMD GT26CW Data Sheet by Jean-Denis Bachand
Electro-Motive Division Export Models
Astilleros Argentinos Rio de la Plata S.A. Export Models
Henschel und Sohn GmbH Export Models
Türkiye Lokomotif ve Motor Sanayii A.Ş Export Models
Equipamentos Villares S.A. Export Models
General Motors Diesel Division Export Models
Hyundai Rolling Stock Company Export Models
Material Y Construcciones S.A. Export Models
General Motors South Africa Export Models
Clyde Engineering Export Models

C-C locomotives
Export locomotives
Railway locomotives introduced in 1967
G26T
Metre gauge diesel locomotives
3 ft 6 in gauge locomotives
Standard gauge railway locomotives
G26T